York County School District 3 (also known as Rock Hill Schools) is the largest of the four public school districts in York County, South Carolina, USA. The district serves students in and around the city of Rock Hill, approximately 20 miles south of Charlotte, North Carolina.

School Board

Schools

Elementary schools
 Belleview Elementary
 Children's School at Sylvia Circle
 Cherry Park Elementary School of Language Immersion
 Ebenezer Avenue Elementary
 Ebinport Elementary
 Finley Road Elementary
 Independence Elementary
 India Hook Elementary
 Lesslie Elementary
 Mount Gallant Elementary
 Mount Holly Elementary
 Northside Elementary School of the Arts
 Oakdale Elementary
 Old Pointe Elementary
 Richmond Drive Elementary
 Rosewood Elementary
 Sunset Park Center for Accelerated Studies
 York Road Elementary
 Rock Hill Schools Virtual Academy

Middle schools
 Castle Heights Middle School
 Dutchman Creek Middle School
 Rawlinson Road Middle School
 Saluda Trail Middle School
 Sullivan Middle School
 Rock Hill Schools Virtual Academy

High schools
 Northwestern High School
 Rock Hill High School
 South Pointe High School
 Rock Hill Schools Virtual Academy

References

Further reading

External links
 

School districts in South Carolina
Education in York County, South Carolina
Rock Hill, South Carolina
Rock Hill